This is a list of number one singles on the Billboard Japan Hot 100 chart in Japan in 2010.

References 

2010 in Japanese music
Japan
Lists of number-one songs in Japan